In geometry, a near-miss Johnson solid is a strictly convex polyhedron whose faces are close to being regular polygons but some or all of which are not precisely regular. Thus, it fails to meet the definition of a Johnson solid, a polyhedron whose faces are all regular, though it "can often be physically constructed without noticing the discrepancy" between its regular and irregular faces. The precise number of near-misses depends on how closely the faces of such a polyhedron are required to approximate regular polygons.

Some near-misses with high symmetry are also symmetrohedra with some truly regular polygon faces.

Some near-misses are also zonohedra.

Examples

Coplanar misses

Some failed Johnson solid candidates have coplanar faces. These polyhedra can be perturbed to become convex with faces that are arbitrarily close to regular polygons. These cases use 4.4.4.4 vertex figures of the square tiling, 3.3.3.3.3.3 vertex figure of the triangular tiling, as well as 60 degree rhombi divided double equilateral triangle faces, or a 60 degree trapezoid as three equilateral triangles. It is possible to take an infinite amount of distinct coplanar misses from sections of the cubic honeycomb (alternatively convex polycubes) or alternated cubic honeycomb, ignoring any obscured faces.

Examples:
3.3.3.3.3.3

4.4.4.4

3.4.6.4:

See also
Geodesic polyhedron
Goldberg polyhedron
Johnson solid
Platonic solid
Semiregular polyhedron
Archimedean solid
Prism
Antiprism

References

External links
Near-miss Johnson solid, Polytope Wiki (74)
Johnson Solid Near Misses, Polyhedra by Jim McNeil (31)
Near Misses, Craig S. Kaplan (5)

Polyhedra